Schaberg is a surname. Notable people with the surname include:

 David Schaberg (born 1964), American academic
 Jane Schaberg (1938–2012), American academic
 Ralf Schaberg (born 1977), German slalom canoeist